is a former Japanese football player and manager.

Playing career
Tsukano was born in Yonago on October 12, 1970. After graduating from Waseda University, he joined Japan Football League club Honda in 1993. He played as regular player from first season. In 1995, he moved to Vissel Kobe. However he could not play many matches. In 1997, he moved to Tokyo Gas and he played many matches. In 1998, he moved to his local club SC Tottori in Regional Leagues. He played many matches and the club was promoted to Japan Football League in 2001. He retired end of 2002 season.

Coaching career
After retirement, Tsukano started coaching career at SC Tottori (later Gainare Tottori) in 2003. He managed the club in 2 seasons until 2004. In 2005, he became a general manager. In 2006, he moved to Shonan Bellmare and coached youth team. In 2007, he returned to Gainare Tottori and became a president.

Club statistics

References

External links

J.League

1970 births
Living people
Waseda University alumni
Association football people from Tottori Prefecture
Japanese footballers
J1 League players
Japan Football League (1992–1998) players
Japan Football League players
Honda FC players
Vissel Kobe players
FC Tokyo players
Gainare Tottori players
Japanese football managers
Gainare Tottori managers
Association football midfielders
People from Yonago, Tottori